John Houlding ( – 17 March 1902) was an English businessman, most notable for being Lord Mayor of Liverpool, and the founder of Liverpool Football Club. In November 2017, Houlding was commemorated with a bronze bust outside Anfield to mark the 125th anniversary of Liverpool F.C.

Biography
Houlding was a businessman in the city of Liverpool. He was educated at Liverpool College and was active towards the end of the 19th century, owning a brewery that left him in a comfortable financial state for the rest of his life. He was elected to the Liverpool City Council as a Conservative representing the Everton ward, before being appointed Lord Mayor of Liverpool in 1897. He was also a member of the Orange Order, a Protestant fraternal organization that had a large following in the Liverpool area. Houlding was also a freemason and founded Anfield Lodge No. 2215, he also attended Everton Lodge No. 823 and Hamer Lodge No. 1395. He was Provincial Senior Grand Warden in West Lancashire and, in 1897, was appointed Senior Grand Deacon. Houlding also attained the 33° of the Ancient and Accepted Scottish Rite.

Prior to his election Houlding was involved with the city's first professional football team, Everton F.C. In 1882, a ruling forced Everton to play their games at an enclosed ground, having previously played them on the public Stanley Park. A meeting held in the Sandon Hotel in Anfield, Liverpool, owned by Houlding, led to Everton F.C. renting a field off Priory Road. When the owner of this field eventually asked them to leave, Houlding secured a new pitch at Anfield Road, paying a small rent to John Orrell, a fellow brewer. The first football match at Anfield was on 28 September 1884, when Everton beat Earlestown 5–0.

At Anfield stands were erected, attendance figures reached 8,000 per game, and Everton became a founding member of the Football League in 1888. However, Houlding was beginning to annoy the club; he increased the rate of interest on his loan to the club, and the players were forced to use the Sandon Hotel in Oakfield Road for changing, both before and after games.

Houlding purchased the land at Anfield Road from Orrell in 1885 and charged rent to Everton F.C. Orrell owned land next to the ground and planned to build an access road across Houlding's land. The only way to stop this was to rent Orrell's land or buy it. Houlding wanted Everton F.C. to buy his land and Orrell's land by floating the club. If his proposals had been accepted, Houlding would have made a lot of money from the purchase of the land and the club would have been run by a small number of large shareholders.

Many of the club's members accused Houlding of trying to make a profit at the club's expense. The club's 279 members met in January 1892 to discuss the matter. Following another meeting on 15 March 1892, the club decided to leave Anfield and find a new ground. Later that year Everton F.C. moved to Goodison Park, on the north side of Stanley Park.

Houlding and Orrell were left with an empty football ground, and Houlding felt that the only proper course of action would be to found a new football club, which he duly did. The new club was called Everton Athletic but the Football Association would not allow this name to be used due to its similarity to the original club, so the new club was renamed Liverpool F.C. Their first ever Liverpool F.C. game was a friendly match with Rotherham Town, then of the Midland League, on 1 September 1892.

Houlding died following a lengthy illness in 1902 in Cimiez, a neighbourhood of Nice, France, in his 69th year. At his funeral, players of both Liverpool and Everton carried his coffin as a mark of respect for all he had done for football in the city. In November 2018, Houlding was commemorated with a bronze bust, which stands at just under 7 feet, outside Anfield, to mark the 125th anniversary of Liverpool F.C.

See also
Founding Fathers of Merseyside Football

References

Everton F.C.
Liverpool F.C. chairmen and investors
Mayors of Liverpool
1833 births
1902 deaths
People educated at Liverpool College
Businesspeople from Liverpool
Freemasons of the United Grand Lodge of England
19th-century English businesspeople